Suzani is a type of embroidered  and decorative tribal textile made in Tajikistan, Uzbekistan, Kazakhstan and other Central Asian countries. Suzani is from the Persian سوزن Suzan which means needle. The art of making such textiles in Iran is called سوزن‌دوزی Suzandozi (needlework).
Suzanis are rather delicate and extremely few examples survive from before the late 18th and early 19th centuries. They belong however to a very ancient tradition. In the early 15th century,  Ruy Gonzáles de Clavijo, the Castilian ambassador to the court of Timur (Tamerlane), left detailed descriptions of embroideries that were probably forerunners of the suzani.

Suzanis were traditionally made by Central Asian brides as part of their dowry, and were presented to the groom on the wedding day.
These hand-embroidered vintage suzanis are infused with the character that only comes from everyday use. The story of each of these suzanis is as rich as their colors and as intricate as the designs that cover their surfaces.

Types 
Bukhara Suzani
Khodjent Suzani (Khodjent, Tajikistan)
Lakai Suzani
Nurata Suzani, made in the town of Nurata in Uzbekistan.
Piskent Suzani
Samarkand Suzani
Shakhrisabz Suzani 
Tashkent Suzani
Ura Tube Suzani (Istaravshan, Tajikistan)

See also
Kaitag textiles, embroidery style from Dagestan
Tush kyiz
Pateh, embroidered wool textile from Kerman province in Iran

References

Sources and external links

Guide to Suzani by Barry O'Connell. Photographs of all types of suzanis.
Article on suzanis
Contemporary Uzbek suzanis by Marla Mallett. Includes details of embroidery techniques.
"Splendid Suzanis, 2003, Saudi Aramco World
All about suzani from Central Asia
TRC Needles entry on suzanis.

Kazakhstani culture
Embroidery
Uzbekistani culture
Tajikistani culture